The 2015 Calder Cup playoffs of the American Hockey League began on April 22, 2015, with the playoff format that was introduced in 2012. The sixteen teams that qualified, eight from each conference, will play best-of-five series in the conference quarterfinals, with the playoffs to continue with best-of-seven series for the conference semi-finals, conference finals, and Calder Cup finals. The Manchester Monarchs defeated the Utica Comets in five games to win the Calder Cup for the first time in franchise history, and the last prior to their relocation as the Ontario Reign.

Playoff seeds
After the 2014–15 AHL regular season, 16 teams qualified for the playoffs. The top eight teams from each conference qualifies for the playoffs.

Eastern Conference

Atlantic Division
 Manchester Monarchs – 109 points
 Providence Bruins – 91 points
 Worcester Sharks – 88 points
 Portland Pirates – 87 points

Northeast Division
 Hartford Wolf Pack – 95 points
 Syracuse Crunch – 92 points

East Division
 Hershey Bears – 100 points
 Wilkes-Barre/Scranton Penguins – 97 points

Western Conference

West Division
 San Antonio Rampage – 98 points
 Texas Stars – 94 points
 Oklahoma City Barons – 90 points

Midwest Division
 Grand Rapids Griffins – 100 points
 Rockford IceHogs – 99 points
 Chicago Wolves – 87 points

North Division
 Utica Comets – 103 points
 Toronto Marlies – 89 points

Bracket

Conference quarterfinals 
Note 1: All times are in Eastern Time (UTC-4).
Note 2: Game times in italics signify games to be played only if necessary.
Note 3: Home team is listed first.

Eastern Conference

(1) Manchester Monarchs vs. (8) Portland Pirates

(2) Hershey Bears vs. (7) Worcester Sharks

(3) Hartford Wolf Pack vs. (6) Providence Bruins

(4) Wilkes-Barre/Scranton Penguins vs. (5) Syracuse Crunch

Western Conference

(1) Utica Comets vs. (8) Chicago Wolves

(2) Grand Rapids Griffins vs. (7) Toronto Marlies

(3) San Antonio Rampage vs. (6) Oklahoma City Barons

(4) Rockford IceHogs vs. (5) Texas Stars

Conference semifinals

Eastern Conference

(1) Manchester Monarchs vs. (4) Wilkes-Barre/Scranton Penguins

(2) Hershey Bears vs. (3) Hartford Wolf Pack 

*The games scheduled for May 10 and May 11 were played at DCU Center due to the lack of availability at XL Center.

Western Conference

(1) Utica Comets vs. (6) Oklahoma City Barons

(2) Grand Rapids Griffins vs. (4) Rockford IceHogs

Conference finals

Eastern Conference

(1) Manchester Monarchs vs. (3) Hartford Wolf Pack

Western Conference

(1) Utica Comets vs. (2) Grand Rapids Griffins

Calder Cup Finals

Manchester Monarchs vs. Utica Comets

Playoff statistical leaders

Leading skaters

These are the top ten skaters based on points. If there is a tie in points, goals take precedence over assists.

GP = Games played; G = Goals; A = Assists; Pts = Points; +/– = Plus-minus; PIM = Penalty minutes

Leading goaltenders 

This is a combined table of the top five goaltenders based on goals against average and the top five goaltenders based on save percentage with at least 180 minutes played. The table is initially sorted by goals against average, with the criterion for inclusion in bold.

GP = Games played; W = Wins; L = Losses; SA = Shots against; GA = Goals against; GAA = Goals against average; SV% = Save percentage; SO = Shutouts; TOI = Time on ice (in minutes)

References

Calder Cup playoffs
Calder Cup Playoffs